The 2011 TicketCity Bowl was a college football bowl game played at Cotton Bowl in Dallas, Texas. The game was played on January 1, 2011, at 12:00 p.m. ET and was telecast on ESPNU. This game replaced the Cotton Bowl Classic, which moved from its long-time home to Cowboys Stadium in nearby Arlington in 2010, and pitted the Northwestern Wildcats from the Big Ten Conference against the Texas Tech Red Raiders from the Big 12 Conference. The game was originally labeled "The Dallas Football Classic," but on November 8, 2010, a deal was announced for TicketCity to become the title sponsor of the bowl.

Teams

Northwestern Wildcats

Northwestern was invited to the TicketCity Bowl after posting a 7–5 record in the regular season.  The Wildcats made a school-record third-consecutive bowl appearance. The Wildcats had not won a bowl game since defeating California in the 1949 Rose Bowl. They fell to Auburn, 38–35, in overtime of the Outback Bowl last season.  Northwestern has gone 0–2 since losing starting quarterback Dan Persa to a season-ending injury.

Texas Tech Red Raiders

Texas Tech finished the regular season with a 7–5 record. The Red Raiders lost to three ranked opponents, Oklahoma, Oklahoma State and Texas, and defeated one, Missouri. They were on a two-game winning streak leading into the bowl game. Tech was ranked #24 in Jeff Sagarin's BCS computer ranking heading into the bowl matchup. This was the Raiders' eleventh-straight bowl game. They have gone 6–2 in their last eight bowl games, including defeating Michigan State in last year's Alamo Bowl 41–31.

Game notes
Northwestern made its first appearance in a bowl game at the Cotton Bowl, while Texas Tech playing in its fifth bowl at the Stadium. The two teams had never played each other in the history of their programs. With the win, Tech won their first bowl game at the Cotton Bowl after failing the past four times in a drought that had begun in 1939.

Game summary

Scoring summary

References

External links
 Game summary at ESPN

TicketCity Bowl
First Responder Bowl
Northwestern Wildcats football bowl games
Texas Tech Red Raiders football bowl games
January 2011 sports events in the United States
TicketCity Bowl
2010s in Dallas